Pieris marginalis reicheli, the Reichel's margined white butterfly, is one of the many subspecies of Pieris marginalis. Its range is mainly confined to British Columbia, Canada.

marginalis reicheli
Butterflies described in 1983
Butterfly subspecies